Forest Heights is a town in Prince George's County, Maryland, United States, and is part of the larger postal designation of Oxon Hill. The town straddles both sides of dual-lane Maryland Route 210 and includes two elementary schools. Per the 2020 census, the population was 2,658.

History
A few homes (such as on Huron Drive) were built in the 1930s, but most of the town developed in the 1940s and early 1950s, consisting of single-family homes with some streets of duplex homes; the Talbert Drive homes were added in the 1960s. In those days many town residents were scientists (as Mayor Armhold was) at the adjacent U.S. Naval Research Laboratory, while others were military band musicians or other Federal employees.  The town's population was approximately 3,600 in 1960, almost 50% more than the 2010 population of 2,447, perhaps due to households having more children in 1960.

Two especially long-serving mayors were Clifford Armhold and Warren F. Adams.

After decades of former governmental stability, in the 2000s the town made headlines repeatedly as two of its recent mayors were embroiled in clashes with the town council. One mayor, Joyce Beck, was ousted from office after changes to the Town Charter.  In June 2009 her successor, Myles Spires, filed a $15 million lawsuit against the town for malicious prosecution after being cleared of all charges initiated by the town for misuse of town's funds. In 2019, the town annexed 446.88 acres of additional land, more than doubling its size.

Geography
Forest Heights is located at  (38.811863, -76.996809).

Forest Heights is bordered on the north by the Eastover Shopping Center. Several miles of less affluent areas within the District of Columbia (see Anacostia, Washington Highlands, and Bellevue) also lie to the north of it.  Forest Heights has its own town police force, in addition to a Prince George's County police station right at the town limits in the aforementioned Eastover Shopping Center. Rivertowne Shopping Center with a K-Mart and a Home Depot, and a very large, modern public library, are both just one to two miles from Forest Heights. Forest Heights is bordered on the south by the large new National Harbor conference center and resort, which opened its first phase in April 2008.

Adjacent areas
 National Harbor (southwest)
 Oxon Hill (southeast)
 Glassmanor (northeast)
 Bellevue, Congress Heights and Anacostia neighborhoods of Washington, D.C. (north)

Demographics

2020 census

Note: the US Census treats Hispanic/Latino as an ethnic category. This table excludes Latinos from the racial categories and assigns them to a separate category. Hispanics/Latinos can be of any race.

2010 census
As of the census of 2010, there were 2,447 people, 868 households, and 619 families residing in the town. The racial makeup of the town was 11.9% White, 75.4% African American, 0.3% Native American, 3.9% Asian, 0.1% Pacific Islander, 5.8% from other races, and 2.6% from two or more races. Hispanic or Latino of any race were 11.3% of the population.

There were 868 households, of which 31.3% had children under the age of 18 living with them, 39.3% were married couples living together, 24.4% had a female householder with no husband present, 7.6% had a male householder with no wife present, and 28.7% were non-families. 22.7% of all households were made up of individuals, and 7.1% had someone living alone who was 65 years of age or older. The average household size was 2.82 and the average family size was 3.26.

The median age in the town was 41.1 years. 20.8% of residents were under the age of 18; 9.9% were between the ages of 18 and 24; 24.6% were from 25 to 44; 31.4% were from 45 to 64; and 13.4% were 65 years of age or older. The gender makeup of the town was 47.9% male and 52.1% female.

2000 census
As of the census of 2000, there were 2,585 people, 897 households, and 670 families residing in the town. The racial makeup of the town was 13.38% White, 79.11% African American, 0.12% Native American, 3.37% Asian, 0.35% Pacific Islander, 1.74% from other races, and 1.93% from two or more races. Hispanic or Latino of any race were 2.94% of the population.

There were 897 households, out of which 31.1% had children under the age of 18 living with them, 45.6% were married couples living together, 23.4% had a female householder with no husband present, and 25.3% were non-families. 19.8% of all households were made up of individuals, and 5.5% had someone living alone who was 65 years of age or older. The average household size was 2.88 and the average family size was 3.34.

In the town, the population was spread out, with 27.3% under the age of 18, 7.4% from 18 to 24, 25.9% from 25 to 44, 28.6% from 45 to 64, and 10.8% who were 65 years of age or older. The median age was 38 years. For every 100 females, there were 88.8 males. For every 100 females age 18 and over, there were 82.5 males.

The median income for a household in the town was $57,697, and the median income for a family was $60,313. Males had a median income of $35,705 versus $35,273 for females. The per capita income for the town was $21,556. About 2.8% of families and 3.3% of the population were below the poverty line, including 5.4% of those under age 18 and none of those age 65 or over.

Public safety
The town is served by its own Forest Heights Police Department, which maintains primary responsibility for the response to and prevention and investigation of the majority of all crimes within the corporate limits. Under a memorandum of understanding, the Prince George's County Police Department serves as the secondary responding law enforcement agency for the town, and the primary investigating agency for most serious crimes, such as homicide or rape. Since 2019 the Chief of Police has been Anthony Rease.

The County Police Department maintains its District IV station just outside Forest Height's northern border at Eastover Shopping Center, in Glassmanor CDP. Fire and rescue services are provided by Prince George's County Fire Department from neighboring Company 42 and Company 21, both in Oxon Hill.

Transportation

The most prominent highway serving Forest Heights is Interstate 95/Interstate 495 (the Capital Beltway). I-495 follows the Capital Beltway around Washington, D.C., providing access to its many other suburbs. I-95 only follows the eastern portion of the beltway, diverging away from the beltway near both its north and south ends. To the north, I-95 passes through Baltimore, Philadelphia, New York City and Boston on its way to Canada, while to the south, it traverses Richmond on its way to Florida.

Maryland Route 210 and Maryland Route 414 also serve Forest Heights. MD 210 provides the direct access from Forest Heights to I-95/I-495, following Indian Head Highway from the Washington, D.C. border southward to Indian Head. MD 414 follows Saint Barnabas Road, running parallel to the Capital Beltway and providing local access to nearby communities.

Education
Prince George's County Public Schools operates public schools serving Forest Heights. There are two elementary schools in the town limits, Forest Heights and Flintstone; these two schools serve separate portions of Forest Heights.
All residents are zoned to Oxon Hill Middle School and Potomac High School.

Prince George's County Memorial Library System operates the Oxon Hill Library in nearby Oxon Hill.

References

External links

 Town of Forest Heights official website
 Maryland State Archives site for Forest Heights

Towns in Maryland
Towns in Prince George's County, Maryland
Maryland populated places on the Potomac River
Washington metropolitan area